Thomas Peregrine Courtenay PC (31 May 1782 – 8 July 1841) was a British politician and writer. He served as Vice-President of the Board of Trade under the Duke of Wellington between 1828 and 1830.

Background
Courtenay was the second son of the Right Reverend Henry Reginald Courtenay (d.1803), Bishop of Exeter, and his wife Lady Elizabeth Howard, daughter of Thomas Howard, 2nd Earl of Effingham. His paternal grandmother Lady Catherine was the daughter of Allen Bathurst, 1st Earl Bathurst.  His elder brother was William Courtenay, 10th Earl of Devon (1777–1859).

Political career
Courtenay sat as Member of Parliament for Totnes from 1811 to 1832 and served under the Duke of Wellington as Vice-President of the Board of Trade from 1828 to 1830. In 1828 he was sworn of the Privy Council.

Publications
Courtenay was also a writer and published among other works Memoirs of the Life, Works and Correspondence of Sir William Temple, Bart (London, 1836) and Commentaries on the historical plays of Shakspeare.

Family
Courtenay married Anne, daughter of Mayow Wynell-Mayow, in 1805. They had eight sons and five daughters. Three of their sons gained particular distinction. Their second son the Rt.Rev. Reginald Courtenay (1813–1906) was Bishop of Kingston, Jamaica, between 1856 and 1879. Their sixth son Richard William Courtenay (1820–1904) was a Vice-Admiral in the Royal Navy. Their seventh son Henry Reginald Courtenay (1823–1911) was a Major-General in the Royal Artillery. Courtenay drowned while sea bathing at Torquay. in July 1841, aged 59.

References

1782 births
1841 deaths
Members of the Parliament of the United Kingdom for Totnes
UK MPs 1807–1812
UK MPs 1812–1818
UK MPs 1818–1820
UK MPs 1820–1826
UK MPs 1826–1830
UK MPs 1830–1831
UK MPs 1831–1832
Members of the Privy Council of the United Kingdom